Josep Maria Pou i Serra (born 1944 in Mollet del Vallès, Barcelona) is a Catalan Spanish film, theatre and television actor.

He studied drama in Madrid and made his debut in Teatro María Guerrero (1970)

Cinema 
2018 The Realm
2017 Abracadabra
2012 Blancanieves
2007 Barcelona (un mapa), Ventura Pons
2006 Miguel y William, Inés París
2004 Beneath still waters, Brian Yuzna 
2003 Mar adentro, Alejandro Amenábar 
2003 Tiovivo c. 1950, José Luis Garci  
2003 Sevignè, Marta Balletbó 
2003 Las viandas (cortometraje), José A. Bonet 
1998 Goya en Burdeos, Carlos Saura 
1998 Pepe Guindo, Manuel Iborra 
1998 Amic/Amat, Ventura Pons 
1998 La hora de los valientes, Antonio Mercero 
1997 Subjudice, Josep María Forn 
1997 Los años bárbaros, Fernando Colomo 
1996 El crimen del cine Oriente, Pedro Costa 
1995 La duquesa roja, Francesc Betriu 
1995 El efecto mariposa, Fernando Colomo 
1995 Tot veri, (Puro veneno), Xavier Ribera 
1995 Gran Slalom, Jaime Chávarri 
1994 Hermana, ¿pero qué has hecho, Pedro Masó 
1994 Historias del Kronen, Montxo Armendáriz 
1993 El pájaro de la felicidad, Pilar Miró 
1991 Los papeles de Aspern, Jordi Cadena 
1989 La bañera, Jesús Garay 
1989 Pont de Varsovia, Pere Portabella 
1987 Berlen blues, Ricardo Franco 
1987 Remando al viento, Gonzalo Suárez 
1987 El complot dels anells, Francesc Bellmunt 
1986 Madrid, Basilio Martin Patiño 
1986 Hay que deshacer la casa, José Luis García Sánchez 
1985 El caballero del dragón, Fernando Colomo 
1984 La noche más hermosa, Manuel Gutiérrez Aragón 
1981 Adolescencia, Germán Lorente 
1977 Reina Zanahoria, Gonzalo Suárez 
1976 El segundo poder, José María Forqué 
1975 La espada negra, Francisco Rovira Beleta 
1974 La madrastra, Roberto Gavaldón 
1973 La mujer prohibida, José Luis Ruiz Marcos

 Theatre 

2006-2007 La nit just abans dels boscos, by Bernard-Marie Koltès.
2005-2007 La cabra o Qui és Sylvia? /La cabra o ¿quién es Sylvia?  (The Goat or Who Is Sylvia?), by Edward Albee.
2004-2005 El rei Lear/El rey Lear (King Lear), by William Shakespeare
2003-2004 Celobert (Skylight),  by David Hare
2003 Bartleby, l'escrivent (Bartleby, the Scrivener), by Herman Melville
2003 Estrellas bajo las estrellas Festival de Teatro de Mérida1998 Arte (Art), by   Yasmina Reza 
1997  The Seagull (Чайка), by Anton Chekhov (Антон Павлович Чехов)
1996-1997 Àngels a Amèrica (Angels in America), by Tony Kushner
1994 La corona d'espines, by Josep Maria de Sagarra
1993 Espectres/Espectros (Gengangere), by Henrik Ibsen
1993 Golfos de Roma (A Funny Thing Happened on the Way to the Forum), by Stephen Sondheim
1993 El cazador de leones, by Javier Tomeo
1991 La verdad sospechosa, by Juan Ruiz de Alarcón
1991 El gallitigre, de Javier Tomeo
1991 Desig, by Josep Maria Benet i Jornet
1989 Amado monstruo, by Javier Tomeo
1988 Lorenzaccio, de Alfred de Musset
1987 És així, si us ho sembla (Così è, se vi pare), by Luigi Pirandello
1985 The Mistress of the Inn, by Carlo Goldoni
1985 Anselmo B, by Francisco Melgares
1984 Al derecho y al revés (Noises Off ), by Michael Fryan
1984 El dúo de la africana,  by Echegaray and Fernández Caballero
1984 Las mujeres sabias (Les femmes savantes), by Molière
1983 El barón, by Moratín
1983 Casa de muñecas (Et dukkehjem), by Henrik Ibsen
1982 El sombrero de copa,  by Vital Aza
1982 Coronada y el toro, by Francisco Nieva
1981 El galán fantasma, by Calderón de la Barca
1978 El médico a palos (Le Médecin malgré lui ), by Molière
1978 Las bacantes (The Bacchae), by Euripides 
1978 Las galas del difunto y la hija del capitán, by Valle-Inclán
1976 La carroza de plomo candente, by Francisco Nieva
1976 Galileo Galilei, de Bertolt Brecht
1973 Canta, gallo acorralado (Cock-a-Doodle Dandy ), by Seán O'Casey
1973 La ciudad en la que reina un niño (La Ville dont le prince est un enfant ), by Henry de Montherlant
1973 Las tres hermanas (Три сестры, Three Sisters (play)) by Anton Chekhov (Антон Павлович Чехов)
1972 Los caciques, by Carlos Arniches
1972 Misericordia, by Benito Pérez Galdós
1971 Dulcinea, by Gaston Baty
1971 Antígona, ( Antigone, Ἀντιγόνη) by Sophocles (Σοφοκλῆς)
1971 El círculo de tiza caucasiano, (Der Kaukasische Kreidekreis) by Bertolt Brecht
1970 Romance de lobos, by Valle-Inclán
1969 Los Fantástikos (The Fantastiks ), by Tom Jones and Harvey Schmidt
1968 Marat-Sade, by Peter Weiss

Television 
2018 La Catedral del Mar (Cathedral of the Sea), Sahat
2016 Nit i dia, Benet
2007 Quart, Monseñor Aguirre
2001 Carles, príncep de Viana
Estació d'enllaç
Investigación Policial
El Club de la Comedia
Siete Vidas
Policías, en el corazón de la calle
1974 Estudio 1 con la obra Las Meninas
2005 Un Personatge, un paisatge

Main prizes 
2007 
 Premio Terenci Moix.
 Premios Max al mejor director de escena por La cabra o quién es Sylvia, 
 Premios Max al mejor espectáculo, 
 Premios Max a la mejor adaptación teatral 
 Premios Max al mejor empresario.
2004 Premi Nacional de Teatre de la Generalitat de Catalunya.
2002 Premio de Interpretación en el Festival Internacional de TV. de Venecia
1988 Premi Sant Jordi de Cinematografia for EL COMPLOT DELS ANELLS
1984 Premio Ricardo Calvo del Ayuntamiento de Madrid al mejor actor
4 Premis de la Crítica de Barcelona

External links
 and : Pàgina oficial de Josep Maria Pou (official website)
 "Triunfo de Josep Maria Pou en los Max con cuatro galardones", El País, 2007
 Josep Maria Pou on IMDb

1944 births
Living people
Male stage actors from Catalonia
Male film actors from Catalonia
Male television actors from Catalonia
20th-century Spanish male actors
21st-century Spanish male actors